"Yacht Club" is a song by American rapper Lil Yachty featuring fellow American rapper Juice WRLD. It was released as the fifth track off of Yachty's third studio album Nuthin' 2 Prove. The track peaked at number 91 on the Billboard Hot 100.

Background 
The track is the first official collaboration between Lil Yachty and Juice WRLD.

Composition 
One of the lines in the track features Yachty and Juice WRLD rapping, "I'm a young king, I might fuck Alexis Texas / But I ain't on no Drake shit, I won't get her pregnant". Yachty said that Drake allegedly laughed at the line.

Critical reception 
The track received generally positive reviews. Lawrence Burney of The Fader called the track "smooth" and "catchy". Austin Myers of The Standard called the song "the best track on this project". Thomas Hobbs of Highsnobiety called the song Yachty's "best performance as a rapper" on the album and called the lines on the track "mischievous". Sam Moore of NME called the track "refreshing" and "a much-needed boost".

Charts

Certifications

References 

2018 songs
Songs written by Lil Yachty
Songs written by Juice Wrld